As defined by FS-1037C and ITU Radio Regulations, radiodetermination is:
<blockquote>"the determination of the position, velocity or other characteristics of an object, or the obtaining of information relating to these parameters, by means of the propagation properties of radio waves."</blockquote>

There are two main fields to radiodetermination:
 radionavigation: "used for the purposes of navigation, including obstruction warning", which is mainly active;
 radiolocation: "used for purposes other than those of radionavigation", which is mainly passive.

Examples

International regulation

Radiodetermination service is – according to Article 1.40 of the International Telecommunication Union's (ITU) Radio Regulations (RR) – defined as «A radiocommunication service for the purpose of radiodetermination.»

Classification
This radiocommunication service is classified in accordance with ITU Radio Regulations (article 1) as follows: 
Radiodetermination service (article 1.40) 
Radiodetermination-satellite service' (article 1.41)
Radionavigation service (article 1.42)
Radionavigation-satellite service (article 1.43) 
Maritime radionavigation service (article 1.444) 
Maritime radionavigation-satellite service (article 1.45) 
Aeronautical radionavigation service (article 1.46) 
Aeronautical radionavigation-satellite service (article 1.47) 
Radiolocation service (article 1.48) 
Radiolocation-satellite service (article 1.49)

Stations
A radiodetermination station is – according to article 1.86 of the International Telecommunication Union´s (ITU) ITU Radio Regulations (RR) – defined as "A radio station in the radiodetermination service.""

A radiodetermination station uses reception of radio waves in order to determine the location of an object, under the condition that this thing is reflecting and/or transmitting radio waves. This designation may also be the collective name of any radar set in general, up to target location, illuminating, acquisition and tracking, as well as radar sigh, altimeter and precision-guided munitions or bombs.

Each radiodetermination station shall be classified by the radiocommunication service in which it operates permanently or temporarily. In accordance with ITU Radio Regulations (article 1) this type of radio station might be classified as follows: 
Radiodetermination station 
Radionavigation mobile station (article 1.87) of the radionavigation service (article 1.42)
Radionavigation land station (article 1.88) of the radionavigation service
Radiolocation mobile station (article 1.89) of the radiolocation service (article 1.48)
Radiolocation land station (article 1.90) of the radiolocation service
Radio direction-finding station (article 1.91)

Selection radiodetermination stations'':

See also 
 Real time locating

References

Further reading

External links 
 International Telecommunication Union (ITU)

International Telecommunication Union
Wireless locating